Gerersdorf-Sulz (() is a municipality in the district of Güssing in the Austrian state of Burgenland.

Population

References 

Cities and towns in Güssing District